Von Ryan's Express is a 1965 World War II adventure film starring Frank Sinatra, Trevor Howard, and Raffaella Carrà, and directed by Mark Robson. Produced in CinemaScope, the film depicts a group of Allied prisoners of war (POWs) who conduct a daring escape by hijacking the freight train carrying the POWs and fleeing through German-occupied Italy to Switzerland. Based on the 1964 novel by David Westheimer, the film changes several aspects of the novel, most notably the ending, which is considerably more upbeat in the book. Financially, it became one of Sinatra's most successful films.

Plot
Colonel Joseph Ryan, a USAAF P-38 pilot, is shot down over Italy and taken to a POW camp. Ryan insists that the camp commander, Major Basilio Battaglia salute him as a superior officer, which the sympathetic second-in-command, Captain Vittorio Oriani, translates. Most prisoners are British from the 9th Fusiliers. Their previous commanding officer recently died due to being placed in the "sweat box" as punishment for hitting Battaglia. Major Eric Fincham is the senior British officer until Ryan, being senior, arrives and assumes command.

Italy is close to surrender, and Ryan declines to support Fincham's escape attempts. When Fincham captures American prisoners stealing medical supplies from a British secret hoard, Ryan orders Fincham to distribute the medicines to the seriously ill prisoners.

He infuriates Fincham by revealing an escape plan to Battaglia in exchange for prisoners being treated better. When Battaglia refuses to issue new clothing, Ryan orders prisoners to strip and burn their filthy uniforms. Battaglia throws Ryan into the sweat box as punishment.

When Italy surrenders, the guards flee; the British promptly try Battaglia as a war criminal. He portrays himself as a broken man who has repudiated fascism. Rather than executing him, Ryan sentences him to the sweat box.

A German fighter plane overflies the camp, forcing Ryan and the men to flee into the Italian countryside with Oriani's help. They hide out in some ruins while Ryan attempts to contact Allied forces. The next morning, the Germans recapture the prisoners and load them onto a northbound train. Fincham assumes Oriani betrayed them until he is found severely battered aboard the train's prisoner carriage. The Germans then shoot all ill prisoners. Fincham blames Ryan for letting Battaglia live, and derogatively calls him "von Ryan". The train travels to Rome, where a German officer, Major von Klemment, takes command.

Ryan pries up the railcar floorboards. That night, when the train stops, Ryan, Fincham, and Lt. Orde sneak out and kill several guards. They free a boxcar load of POWs, who help them kill the remaining guards whose uniforms they then don as a disguise. Ryan and Fincham capture von Klemment and his mistress, Gabriella. As the train moves out, another train follows. Von Klemment reveals that the second train is carrying German troops and is on the same schedule. Further, von Klemment is to receive orders at each railway station. A German-speaking American chaplain, Captain Costanzo, impersonates the German commander to ensure their passage through the next station in Florence.

Through documents received in Florence, they learn that both trains are headed towards Innsbruck, Austria. Through trickery and a quickly forged typewritten order, the prisoners switch their train onto a different line at Bologna. The troop train continues on toward Innsbruck. Von Klemment and Gabriella are kept bound and gagged, but they escape at a stop, killing Orde. Both are shot by Ryan and the train proceeds.

Later, German commanders learn of the train's diversion and begin queries. That night the train stops at what is thought to be a clearing and the men get off to head for safety; aircraft, which Ryan identifies as Lancaster bombers appear overhead and begin bombing the area. Ryan orders everyone back on the train. The train restarts and passes an oil storage yard being bombed by the Allied aircraft. Several cars catch fire, and the train must stop to aid wounded and release burning boxcars.

With three dead and some sixty wounded, Oriani and the train's Italian engineer tell Ryan and Finchum that the only option is to reroute the train at Milan to neutral Switzerland. Waffen-SS troops, led by Colonel Gortz, have discovered the earlier ruse and await the train, but are slowed when Oriani and the men disable a signal box at Milan, knocking out the track diagrams inside the control center. The prisoners reroute the train northwest through manual switching and drive straight through without stopping.

When the train diagrams are finally reactivated, Gortz realizes he has been outmaneuvered and leads troops in pursuit. As the Alps appear, the prisoner train is attacked by German aircraft, rocket fire collapsing boulders onto a section of track. The POWs replace the damaged rail and then pry loose more rail behind them in hopes of overturning the approaching German train, but the Germans see the sabotage and stop in time.  As the Germans race up from behind, Ryan, Fincham, and others stay behind to hold them off, but many are killed in the battle, including Bostick. The prisoner train moves out as the men run for the moving rear platform with the Germans in pursuit. Most make it onto the train, but Ryan is killed by gunfire still running for the train as it approaches Switzerland.

Cast

 Frank Sinatra as Col. Joseph L. Ryan
 Trevor Howard as Maj. Eric Fincham
 Raffaella Carrà as Gabriella
 Brad Dexter as Sgt. Bostick
 Sergio Fantoni as Capt. Oriani
 John Leyton as Lt. Orde
 Edward Mulhare as Capt. Costanzo, the priest
 Wolfgang Preiss as Maj. von Klemment
 James Brolin as Private Ames
 John van Dreelen as Col. Gortz
 Adolfo Celi as Maj. Bassilio Battaglia
 Vito Scotti as Peppino the Italian engineer
 Richard Bakalyan as Cpl. Giannini
 Michael Goodliffe as Capt. Stein
 Michael St. Clair as Sgt. Dunbar
 Ivan Triesault as Obergruppenfuhrer Wilhelm von Kleist

Production

Original novel
The novel was published in 1963. The novelist David Westheimer had been a POW during World War II. He witnessed the bombing of Bolzano in 1943 from a box car. Martin Levin, reviewing the book for the New York Times, said the novel "has everything for the screen but the camera directions."

Development
The novel was a best seller and film rights were bought by 20th Century Fox for a reported $125,000. The studio assigned Saul David to produce and Mark Robson to direct. Robson had intended to make The Centurians, but this was delayed when his chosen star, Anthony Quinn, was unavailable. Frank Sinatra had read the novel and wanted to buy the film rights himself; when he heard they had been lost to Fox, he offered his services for the lead role.

Von Ryan's Express was a project keenly undertaken by 20th Century Fox, which was still financially reeling after the extravagance and critical bashing of Cleopatra. Fox, in a bid to prove that they were still able to make films on an epic scale, shot extensively on location in Europe and built a full-scale prison camp as opposed to shooting on a backlot. It was producer Saul David's first film for Fox. He followed it with Our Man Flint, Fantastic Voyage, and In Like Flint.

Shooting
Rumours of a personality clash between star Frank Sinatra, who was flown by helicopter to the set, and director Mark Robson were not enough to cause problems as the film was shot with relatively little trouble. However, Sinatra did insist that the ending of the film be altered, ending any chance of a sequel. Sinatra also insisted the film be shot in Panavision rather than Fox's CinemaScope.

The film score was written by Jerry Goldsmith.

Von Ryan's Express achieved reality using aircraft, trains and wheeled vehicles photographed on location along with the occasional model. The aircraft alluded to as Messerschmitts were indeed  Messerschmitt Bf 108s. A majority of the film was shot on location around Northern Italy in Cortina d'Ampezzo and Firenze Santa Maria Novella railway station in Florence (in reality is Roma Ostiense railway station). The Ferrovie dello Stato/Italian State Railway closely cooperated on the production, as reflected in the film's closing acknowledgment credit, providing a complete train headed by the specially-bulled up FS Class 735.236. The train which the Nazis commandeer to pursue the escaping POWs is headed by a Franco-Crosti boiler-fitted Class 743.

The railway sequence at the film's conclusion, however, was shot in the Caminito del Rey walkway in the limestone gorge of El Chorro and in the adjacent railway bridge, near Málaga in Andalucía, Spain. This switch from filming in Italy was probably done as the bridge looked more suitably attractive for presenting the final set piece than anything that could be found on the Italian rail network. The train featuring in these sequences was laid on by the RENFE/Spanish National Railways and altered to resemble the Italy-based train. Interiors were completed at 20th Century Fox Studios in Los Angeles. The POW camp (Campo Concentramento Prigioneri di Guerra 202) was also built in the front lot of the Studios.

Reception

Critical
Critics liked Von Ryan's Express. Variety noted, "Mark Robson has made realistic use of the actual Italian setting of the David Westheimer novel in garmenting his action in hard-hitting direction and sharply drawn performances." Frank Sinatra's daughter Nancy noted in her biography of her father that his performance fuelled speculation of another Academy Award nomination. Time Out London called the film a "ripping adventure" that was "directed with amused panache by Robson, and helped no end by a fine cast...", while the BBC's TV, film and radio listings magazine The Radio Times described it as "a rattlingly exciting Second World War escape adventure, with a well-cast Frank Sinatra..."

Box office
The film grossed $17,111,111 ($ in  consumer dollars) at the North American box office, equating to $7,700,000 ($ in  consumer dollars) taken in box office rentals. Variety ranked Von Ryan's Express as the 10th-highest-grossing film of 1965. Additionally, this was Sinatra's highest-grossing and biggest-earning film of the decade.

According to Fox records, the film needed to earn $12,600,000 in rentals to break even and made over $17,000,000, meaning it made a profit.

Awards
The film was nominated for a Best Sound Editing (Walter Rossi) Academy Award in 1966, while the Motion Picture Sound Editors also nominated the film for Best Sound Editing in a Feature Film.

British Channel 4 ranked Von Ryan's Express number 89 on their list of 100 Greatest War Films, commenting, "A ripping yarn culminating in a wild train dash through [Italy], with director Mark Robson cranking up the tension and releasing it with some excellent action set-pieces." It has a 90% fresh rating on Rotten Tomatoes from 20 reviews.

See also
 List of American films of 1965

References

External links
 
 
 
 
  Soundtrack
 

1965 films
1965 war films
American war films
World War II films based on actual events
World War II prisoner of war films
Films about shot-down aviators
Films based on American novels
Films based on military novels
Films directed by Mark Robson
Films set in Italy
Italian Campaign of World War II films
Rail transport films
Films scored by Jerry Goldsmith
1960s English-language films
1960s American films